John of Küküllő ( 13201393) was a Hungarian clergyman, royal official and historian.

Family 
Born as John Apród of Tótsolymos, John was the son of Miklós Apród, a nobleman who received Tótsolymos (now Šarišské Sokolovce in Slovakia) from Charles I of Hungary. He was born around 1320.

Career 
He worked as a notary for the royal chancery before 1350. He became a canon in the Arad Chapter and the Eger Chapter in 1352.

He died between 15 September and 10 December 1393.

Chronicle of King Louis 
He wrote a biography of Louis I of Hungary after 1360. He was the first Hungarian historian to use royal charters while writing his book.

Notes

Sources 

Hungarian chroniclers
14th-century Hungarian historians